is a Shinto shrine in Kurume, Fukuoka Prefecture, Japan.

History
Kōra was founded in the fifth century.  The shrine is mentioned in the Engishiki and was one of the most important shrines in Chikugo Province.

Buildings
The torii of 1654 and the honden, haiden, and heiden of 1661 have been designated Important Cultural Properties.

References

External links
 Kōra Taisha homepage

Beppyo shrines

Shinto shrines in Fukuoka Prefecture
Hachiman faith